The Brisbane International Cruise Terminal is an international cruise ship terminal in Brisbane, Queensland, Australia.

The terminal is located at Luggage Point on the northern bank at the mouth of the Brisbane River in Pinkenba, adjacent to Brisbane Airport. It was designed to accommodate mega-cruise ships over 270 meters long.  It provides the only dock for very large vessels in South East Queensland.

History 
The terminal was long-awaited after decades of complaints about temporary facilities.

The project was developed by the Port of Brisbane. The structure was designed by architectural and design firm, Arkhefield. Construction began in 2018 and was completed in 2020.   

Whilst initially due to open in October 2020, the Covid-19 pandemic caused the opening to be delayed and the first boat to dock at the terminal was the Royal Australian Navy's HMAS Choules on 27August 2021 as the terminal was used as a vaccination centre and Royal Australian Navy stop.

The first cruise ship to use the terminal was the P&O Cruises Australia ship Pacific Explorer on 2 June 2022.

See also

Portside Wharf
Tourism in Brisbane
Transport in Brisbane

References

Pinkenba, Queensland
Tourist attractions in Brisbane
Brisbane River
Transport in Brisbane
Buildings and structures in Brisbane
2020 establishments in Australia
Buildings and structures completed in 2020
Passenger ship terminals
Piers in Australia